General elections were held in the Dominican Republic on 16 May 1942. Rafael Trujillo was the only candidate in the presidential election and was elected unopposed, whilst his Dominican Party won every seat in the Congressional elections. They were the first elections in Dominican history in which women could vote, and three women were elected; Isabel Mayer to the Senate and Milady Félix de L'Official and Josefa Sánchez de González to the Chamber of Deputies.

Results

References

Dominican Republic
1942 in the Dominican Republic
Elections in the Dominican Republic
One-party elections
Single-candidate elections
Presidential elections in the Dominican Republic
Election and referendum articles with incomplete results
May 1942 events